Lawson Heights is a residential neighbourhood located in northern Saskatoon, Saskatchewan, which was developed beginning in the late 1970s.

History
Lawson Heights takes its name from Reverend Stephen George Lawson who homesteaded in the area (northeast quarter of section 10 Township 37 Range 5 West of the 3rd Meridian). He had come from Prince Edward Island and was a Presbyterian minister.

Construction on Lawson Heights began in the late 1970s and was considered completed by the end of 1980s. The average family size is 2.7 with homeownership at 64.6%.  The average home selling price in 2006 was $256,013.

Location
Within the Lawson Suburban Development Area (West Side), the neighbourhood of Lawson Heights is bounded to the north by Lenore Drive.  It is basically triangular in shape. Primrose Drive is to the west. Pinehouse Drive is on the southern edge. Whiteswan Drive provides a scenic drive along the eastern edge, which borders upon the Meewasin Park on the river bank of the South Saskatchewan River.

Recreation
 Saskatoon Kinsmen / Henk Ruys Soccer Centre.
 Lawson Civic Centre opened in 1989 in conjunction with the
Saskatoon's first wave pool
Tropical beach-like pool where the water starts at 0 and tapers off until finally reaching a depth of 6 feet (2 m).
Water features such as whirlpool and toddlers' pool
Multipurpose room
Indoor playground
Fitness room
Poolside deck
Outdoor park area.

Street naming
All the neighbourhood roads are crescents which connect back to the main thoroughfares.  The streets are named after Saskatchewan lakes, and was the first of three neighbourhoods in the city to do this: 

Candle Court, Crescent, Way, Place
Chitek Court, Terrace, Crescent
Cochin Terrace, Crescent, Place, Way
Cypress Court
Dore Way, Crescent
Frobisher Court, Crescent, Way, Place
La Loche Road, Place, Court, Terrace
Lenore Drive
Manitou Court
Nokomis Bay, Crescent, Place, Terrace
Pinehouse Drive, Place
Primrose Drive
Quill Court, Bay, Crescent
Redberry Road
Reindeer Road
Tobin Terrace, Crescent, Place, Way
Turtle Court, Crescent, Place
Wathaman Terrace, Crescent, Place, Way

Government and politics
Lawson Heights exists within the federal electoral district of Saskatoon—University. It is currently represented by Corey Tochor of the Conservative Party of Canada, first elected in 2019.

Provincially, the area is within the constituency of Saskatoon Northwest. It is currently represented by Gordon Wyant of the Saskatchewan Party, first elected in a 2010 by-election.

In Saskatoon's non-partisan municipal politics, Lawson Heights lies within ward 5. It is currently represented by Randy Donauer, first elected in a 2010 by-election.

Library
 Rusty MacDonald Branch Library located in the Lawson Civic Centre celebrated its grand opening in 1989.

Education

Bishop James Mahoney High School - separate (Catholic) secondary, part of Greater Saskatoon Catholic Schools
Christian Centre Academy
Lawson Heights School - public elementary, part of the Saskatoon Public School Division
St. George School - separate (Catholic) elementary, part of Greater Saskatoon Catholic Schools

Economy

Technically The Mall at Lawson Heights, a nearby amenity, is located to the west in the Lawson Heights Suburban Centre, and the suburban centre includes additional commercial development along Primrose and Pinehouse Drive. Within Lawson Heights itself, there is no actual commercial development.

Area Parks
Rochdale Park 
Umea Park, though located in three separate sections within the Lawson Heights Suburban Centre, is also considered an area amenity for residents of Lawson Heights.

Transportation

City Transit 
Lawson Heights is serviced by City Transit Bus RoutesSaskatoon Transit.

Potential bridge crossing 
In February 2019, the City of Saskatoon called for design ideas for a potential river crossing that would primarily carry a sewer line but also be available for non-motorized users (pedestrians and cyclists). The study area for the bridge encompassed from just north of Pinehouse Drive in Lawson Heights to the southern boundary of the wastewater treatment plant in Silverwood Heights, and the proposed bridge linking Whiteswan Drive to the eastern shore of the South Saskatchewan River near the original alignment of Central Avenue north of Fedoruk Drive. Although originally proposed for completion by 2021, as of 2021 no construction has occurred.

Life
Lawson Heights Community Association operates several sports and recreation programs at Lawson Heights and St. George Schools, Marion M. Graham Collegiate, Bishop James Mahoney High School, and local parks.

See also
 Lawson Heights Suburban Centre, Saskatoon, Saskatchewan

References

External links

Lawson Heights Community Association
Local Area Planning
Selling an Idea or a Product
City of Saskatoon City of Saskatoon · Departments · Community Services · City Planning · ZAM Maps
Populace Spring 2006

Neighbourhoods in Saskatoon